Gabriel Vinicius de Oliveira Furtado (born 9 December 1999), known as Gabriel Furtado, is a Brazilian professional footballer who plays for Sampaio Corrêa as either a defensive midfielder or a centre back.

Club career
Born in Taubaté, Furtado started his youth career with the academy of São Carlos, before moving to the academy of Paraná in 2014. On 25 November 2016, he made his senior debut in a 2–0 victory against Tupi, in Série B.

Furtado was loaned out to Série A side Palmeiras on 22 March 2017. On 25 June, he made his first team debut in a 2–1 win against Ponte Preta.

On 14 March 2018, Furtado signed permanently with the club, penning a deal until 2022. On 19 September, he was included in the Palmeiras squad for the season's Copa Libertadores as a replacement for the departing Thiago Martins.

International career
On 13 December 2018, Furtado was included in the under-20 team for the 2019 South American U-20 Championship.

Career statistics

Personal life
Furtado's twin brother Rafael is also a professional footballer. A forward, they shared teams at Paraná.

References

External links

1999 births
Living people
Association football midfielders
Brazilian footballers
Campeonato Brasileiro Série A players
Campeonato Brasileiro Série B players
Paraná Clube players
Sociedade Esportiva Palmeiras players
Esporte Clube Vitória players
Londrina Esporte Clube players
Segunda División B players
Getafe CF B players
Brazilian expatriate footballers
Brazilian expatriate sportspeople in Spain
Expatriate footballers in Spain